Hamilton Mountain is a provincial electoral district in Ontario, Canada, that has been represented in the Legislative Assembly of Ontario since 1967. The riding is located in the Hamilton, Ontario region.

The socio-economic composition of the Hamilton Mountain is diverse, having low-income public housing residents and million-dollar estates, highly paid unionized workers and small-wage unskilled workers, and well-established families and recent immigrants.

Geography

In 2003, the riding was redefined to consist of the part of the City of Hamilton bounded by a line drawn west from the Niagara Escarpment along Red Hill Creek, south along Mountain Brow Boulevard, Arbour Road and Glover Road, west along the hydroelectric transmission line situated south of Rymal Road East, north along Glancaster Road, east along Garner Road East, north along the hydroelectric transmission line situated west of Upper Paradise Road, east along Lincoln M. Alexander Parkway, north along West 5th Street, northeast along James Mountain Road, and east and south along the Niagara Escarpment to the point of commencement.

History
Provincially, this riding has been held by every major Ontario political party having at least one time. The current NDP Member of Provincial Parliament, Monique Taylor, defeated Liberal Cabinet Minister, Sophia Aggelonitis in 2011.

Members of Provincial Parliament
This riding has elected the following members of the Legislative Assembly of Ontario:

Election results

2007 electoral reform referendum

References

Sources
Elections Ontario Past Election Results
Map of riding for 2018 election
Legislative Assembly of Ontario entry for Brian Charlton
Legislative Assembly of Ontario entry for Marie Bountrogianni

Ontario provincial electoral districts
Politics of Hamilton, Ontario